Juan Alejandro Hernández Serrano (more commonly known as Alex Hernández (born 23 June 1999) is a Mexican tennis player.

Hernández has a career high ATP singles ranking of World No. 462 achieved on 15 August 2022. He also has a career high ATP doubles ranking of World No. 555 achieved on 27 May 2019. He is currently the No. 2 Mexican player.

Career

2022: ATP debut and Maiden singles win
Hernández made his ATP main draw debut at the 2022 Abierto Mexicano Telcel after receiving a wildcard into the singles main draw. He lost to Pablo Andújar after winning only one game.

At the 2022 Los Cabos Open he won his first round match against lucky loser Nicolas Barrientos becoming the first Mexican in the singles history of the tournament to win a match in the main draw. As a result he moved more than 50 positions up in the rankings into the top 500. Hernández played 2nd seed Félix Auger-Aliassime in the next round and lost in straight sets.

References

External links

1999 births
Living people
Mexican male tennis players
Sportspeople from Acapulco
21st-century Mexican people